The Löwenstein Formation (Stubensandstein in Baden-Württemberg, Burgsandstein in Bavaria) is a lithostratigraphic formation of the Keuper in Germany. It is underlain by the Mainhardt Formation and overlain by the Trossingen Formation. It dates back to the middle Norian.

Vertebrate fauna
 Ceratodus elegans Vollrath, 1923, a lungfish from the Stubensandstein

Archosaurs 
Theropod tracks and an unnamed herrerasaur genus are known from the Lower Stubensandstein.

See also 
 List of dinosaur-bearing rock formations
 List of fossiliferous stratigraphic units in Germany
 List of fossiliferous stratigraphic units in Switzerland

References

Bibliography 
  

Geologic formations of Germany
Geologic formations of Switzerland
Triassic System of Europe
Triassic Germany
Triassic Switzerland
Norian Stage
Sandstone formations
Paleontology in Germany
Paleontology in Switzerland